Ana Ugalde (born 1925) is a Mexican painter.

Early life and education

Uglade was born in 1925 in San Juan del Río, Querétaro, Mexico. She studied painting under José Ramos Castillo and Prometeo Barragán.

Career

In 1951, Ugalde painted the murals for the Museo Regional de San Diego in Acapulco. Ugalde's first exhibition was the Galería del Grupo Preparatoriano 20-24 show of 1958. In 1959 she was among the artists who produced work for the temple museum annex of the Castillo de Chapultepec; others included Martha Rojas, Enrique Carreón, and Antonio López Sáenz.

In 1963 she was among those hired to produce decorative works for the pre-Hispanic rooms of the Museum of the City of Mexico, alongside Martha Rojas, Héctor Trillo, and her former teacher Barragán. In 1964 she was one of the artists who assembled and decorated the Oaxaca Room of the National Museum of Anthropology. 

Ugalde's work, Sirena, is held in the permanent collection of the Magdalena Mondragón Museum.

Ugalde has also worked as an art restorer, and offers classes in restoration and painting in addition to continuing her easel work.

References

1925 births
Possibly living people
20th-century Mexican painters
20th-century Mexican women artists
21st-century Mexican painters
21st-century Mexican women artists
Artists from Querétaro
Mexican women painters
People from San Juan del Río